Bebhionn, also known as Saturn XXXVII, is a small, irregular natural satellite of Saturn. Its discovery was announced by Scott S. Sheppard, David C. Jewitt, Jan Kleyna, and Brian G. Marsden on 4 May 2005 from observations taken between 12 December 2004 and 9 March 2005.

Bebhionn is about 6 kilometres in diameter and orbits Saturn at an average distance of 16,898 Mm in 820.130 days at an inclination of 41° to the ecliptic (18° to Saturn's equator) and with an eccentricity of 0.333. The rotation period of Bebhionn was measured at  hours by the ISS camera of the Cassini spacecraft. Bebhionn's light curve reflects an elongated shape with large variations in brightness, making it a leading candidate for a contact binary or binary moon.

Name
The moon was named in April 2007 after Béibhinn (Béḃinn), an early Irish goddess of birth, who was renowned for her beauty. The spelling "bh" (older "ḃ") indicates that the second consonant is softened to a "v" sound. The extra "o" in the unusual spelling Bebhionn suggests that the final "nn" should be broad , but is not itself pronounced. The name is still pronounced as a compound (and thus sometimes spelled Bé Binn etc.), so the unstressed vowel is not reduced to a schwa.

References

External links 
 Institute for Astronomy Saturn Satellite Data
 Jewitt's New Satellites of Saturn page May 3, 2005 (includes discovery images)
 IAUC 8523: New Satellites of Saturn May 4, 2005 (discovery)
 MPEC 2005-J13: Twelve New Satellites of  Saturn May 3, 2005 (discovery and ephemeris)
 IAUC 8826: Satellites of Jupiter and Saturn April 5, 2007 (naming the moon)

Gallic group
Moons of Saturn
Irregular satellites
Discoveries by Scott S. Sheppard
20050504
Moons with a prograde orbit